Tourism is an important industry in Metro Manila, Philippines. In 2012, the city and region welcomed 974,379 overnight visitors. As the main gateway to the Philippines' many destinations, the city is visited by the majority of international tourists to the country registering a total of 3,139,756 arrivals in 2012. Global Blue ranked Manila eleventh in its "Best Shopping Destinations" in Asia. The city is ranked tenth in MasterCard's global top 20 fastest growing cities for international visitors from 2009-2013.

Attractions
Metro Manila contains several notable attractions including a UNESCO World Heritage Site and 45 other cultural heritage landmarks. These cultural attractions are mostly concentrated in the City of Manila and offer a glimpse into the city's Chinese, Spanish, and American origins. Popular sites include the Spanish colonial buildings in Intramuros, the World Heritage Site of San Agustin Church, Rizal Park, and a few Art Deco and Revival style buildings like National Museum of Anthropology, National Museum of Fine Arts, and National Museum of Natural History. There are also modern attractions such as the Manila Ocean Park, the integrated resort complex of Resorts World Manila, and the newly opened Solaire Resort & Casino, City of Dreams Manila and Okada Manila in Entertainment City.

Within the City of Manila

Intramuros is a historic fortified complex that is home to Manila's oldest colonial structures. Tourist attractions located inside the complex include Fort Santiago, a Spanish citadel located at the mouth of the Pasig River near Manila Cathedral, a 19th-century ecclesiastical building which is the seat of the Roman Catholic Archdiocese of Manila, San Agustin Church, a UNESCO World Heritage Site.

Located just outside Intramuros is the Rizal Park. It is a 58 hectares (140 acres) historical urban park located along Roxas Boulevard. The Rizal Monument, located in the center of the park, is the memorial to the Philippine national hero, José Rizal. Museums within Manila include the National Museum of Anthropology, an anthropology and archaeology museum; the National Museum of Fine Arts, formerly the National Art Gallery; and the National Museum of Natural History, where Philippine history around the past are found.

The districts of Ermita and Malate are Manila's center for culture, commerce, entertainment and tourism. Ermita, located outside the walls of Intramuros near Luneta, is home to major government buildings and many hotels. The Manila Ocean Park is an oceanarium with a marine-themed mall and hotel, it is located behind Quirino Grandstand, which fronts Rizal Park. Malate, the tourism center of Manila, is famous for the Baywalk and the Adriatico Street nightlife district. Manila Zoo, the oldest zoo and botanical garden in the Philippines, is also located in that district. Binondo, an old district of Manila that is home to Manila's Chinatown, is established since 1521. Its main attractions are Binondo Church, Escolta Street, Divisoria, and Chinese restaurants. Quiapo is the location of Quiapo Church, which is home to the Black Nazarene. The San Sebastian Church, which is also located in Quiapo, is the only all-steel Gothic basilica in Asia.

Major parks in Manila including Paco Park, a recreational garden that was once a Spanish cemetery located in the district of Paco. Malacañang Palace, which is located on the bank of the Pasig River, is the official residence of the President of the Philippines.

Other parts of Metro Manila

Makati CBD, one of Southeast Asia's biggest financial hubs, is noted for its cosmopolitan culture. The city is a major cultural and entertainment hub in Metro Manila. The business districts of Ortigas Center and Bonifacio Global City are also other important cultural, financial and entertainment hubs in the metropolis. Bay City, an entertainment and leisure hub situated along Manila Bay, is home to the SM Mall of Asia, Aseana City, and Entertainment City, which is being developed as a Las Vegas-like gaming and entertainment complex. It contains the Solaire Resort & Casino, City of Dreams Manila, Okada Manila and more world class integrated resort and casinos which are still under construction. Also located in Bay City is the Cultural Center of the Philippines Complex, a 62-hectare (150-acre) arts and culture district along Manila Bay.

Shopping

Manila is the main shopping hub of the Philippines and is one of the well-known shopping destinations in the Asia-Pacific region. Numerous shopping centers are located around the metropolis and are usually clustered in major shopping districts such as the Bonifacio Global City and Ortigas Center while upscale-luxury shopping centers are concentrated in the business and financial district of Ayala Center. Traditional markets still remain a presence in Manila such as bazaars and markets.

Hotels and casinos

A number of hotels and casinos can be found around Metro Manila. Makati, the financial hub of the metropolis is home to numerous international hotel chains. Manila is also home to various casinos and is becoming a major gaming destination in the region. A gaming and entertainment complex called Entertainment City will be home to four integrated casino resorts, this major development is expected to attract more tourists and rival other major gaming destinations in Asia such as Macau and Singapore.

Parks and plazas

Manila offers a wide selection of parks and plazas. The county's premier park, Rizal Park is located in the heart of the bustling city. The park was the site of the execution of the country's national hero, Jose Rizal. Apart from Rizal Park, there also other parks located around Metro Manila such as Quezon Memorial Circle in Quezon City and the Ayala Triangle Gardens in Makati. Plazas are usually found in the districts of Manila, notable ones are Plaza Miranda, Plaza de Roma, Plaza Rajah Sulayman and Plaza San Lorenzo Ruiz.

Events

Festivals in Metro Manila include the Feast of the Black Nazarene, which is held every January in Quiapo district, and it is the biggest religious festival in the city.
Chinese New Year is celebrated in Binondo district, the world's oldest Chinatown. Aliwan Fiesta is held annually in the Cultural Center of the Philippines complex, and it is a celebration of Filipino culture through dance parades, floats, and pageants.
Film festivals include Cinemanila International Film Festival, which is the biggest global film event in Manila. Cinemalaya Philippine Independent Film Festival is another film festival held annually in July at the Cultural Center of the Philippines. Metro Manila Film Festival is held every December during Christmas, and it is an all-Filipino-language film event.
Other events include Manila International Auto Show, the Philippines' biggest motor show at the World Trade Center Metro Manila, and the World Pyro Olympics, an annual competition among the world's fireworks companies held in SM Mall of Asia by Manila Bay.

See also

 List of Cultural Properties of the Philippines in Metro Manila
 List of museums in Metro Manila
 List of Roman Catholic churches in Metro Manila
 List of beaches in the Greater Manila Area
 Tourism in the Philippines
 City of Man

References